This is a list of members of the Tasmanian House of Assembly, elected at the 1989 state election:

 The five cross-bench members were elected as environment-oriented independents, but officially united together to form the Tasmanian Greens during the course of this parliament.
 Liberal member John Bennett resigned in early 1990. Chris Gibson was elected as his replacement on 15 February.
 Liberal member Nick Evers resigned in mid–1990. Brian Davison was elected as his replacement on 6 August.
 Labor member Ken Wriedt resigned in late 1990. Paul Lennon was elected as his replacement on 15 October.

Members of Tasmanian parliaments by term
20th-century Australian politicians